Arnel Mendiola Cerafica is a Filipino politician. He last served as a member of Philippine House of Representatives representing Pateros–Taguig from 2010 to 2019. He was also the Vice Chairman of the House of Representatives Committee on Health.

Prior to his election to Congress, he served as a councilor from the 1st district of Taguig from 2001 to 2007. After serving three terms in the Congress, he unsuccessfully ran for Mayor of Taguig in 2019, wherein his supporters protested the results by holding a rally at Carlos P. Garcia Avenue. He once again ran for mayor in 2022, alongside his wife Janelle for vice mayor, but was still unsuccessful.

References

Living people
Liberal Party (Philippines) politicians
PDP–Laban politicians
People from Taguig
Members of the House of Representatives of the Philippines from Pateros–Taguig
Metro Manila city and municipal councilors
Year of birth missing (living people)